Zackary Flores (born August 31, 1982 in Logan, Utah) is an American soccer player currently without a club after being released by his most recent club, Crystal Palace Baltimore in the USSF Division 2 Professional League.

Career

College and amateur
Flores played college soccer at the Saint Mary's College of California.

Professional
Flores has spent most of his professional career to date in South America, playing for Chacarita Juniors in Argentina, and The Strongest and Club Bolivar in Bolivia. Flores played in the Copa Libertadores and Copa Sudamericana for The Strongest against teams such as Sao Paulo and Boca Juniors.

Flores returned to the United States in 2008, and trained with Chivas USA, before signing a contract to play with Crystal Palace Baltimore for the 2009 season. On March 16, 2010 Baltimore announced the re-signing of Flores to a new contract for the 2010 season.

International
Despite being born in the United States, Flores has aligned himself with the Bolivia national football team, and was called up to and trained with the squad in 2005, but did not take part in any games because of injury.

Personal
Zack is the older brother of former fellow professional soccer player Sergio Flores.

Career statistics
(correct as of 2 October 2010)

References

External links
Crystal Palace Baltimore bio

1982 births
Living people
Sportspeople from Logan, Utah
Association football defenders
American soccer players
American people of Bolivian descent
Saint Mary's Gaels men's soccer players
Chacarita Juniors footballers
The Strongest players
Club Bolívar players
Crystal Palace Baltimore players
USL Second Division players
USSF Division 2 Professional League players
Bolivian expatriate footballers
Expatriate footballers in Argentina